The Pepper-Knepper Quintet is an album led by baritone saxophonist Pepper Adams and trombonist Jimmy Knepper which was recorded in 1958 and originally released on the MetroJazz label.

Reception 

The Allmusic review by Scott Yanow states "The blend between baritone and trombone is quite effective, the musicians all take consistently excellent solos and the music is state-of-the-art 1958 modern mainstream jazz". The Penguin Guide to Jazz described the pairing as producing "a similar blend to that on Cool Sound, but with more expressive resonance and mobility".

Track listing 
 "Minor Catastrophe" (Jon Hendricks) – 6:05
 "All Too Soon" (Duke Ellington, Carl Sigman) – 5:53
 "Beaubien" (Pepper Adams) – 6:23
 "Adams in the Apple" (Jimmy Knepper) – 4:49
 "Riverside Drive" (Leonard Feather) – 5:13
 "I Didn't Know About You" (Ellington, Bob Russell) – 4:27
 "Primrose Path" (Knepper) – 7:04

Personnel 
Pepper Adams – baritone saxophone
Jimmy Knepper – trombone
Wynton Kelly – piano, organ - track 6
Doug Watkins – bass
Elvin Jones – drums

References 

Pepper Adams albums
Jimmy Knepper albums
1958 albums
MetroJazz Records albums